Indika Anuruddha is a Sri Lankan politician and a member of the Parliament of Sri Lanka. He was elected from Gampaha District in 2015.He is a Member of the Sri Lanka Podujana Peramuna. He is a Mining Engineer by profession.

References

Living people
Year of birth missing (living people)
Members of the 15th Parliament of Sri Lanka
Members of the 16th Parliament of Sri Lanka
Sri Lanka Podujana Peramuna politicians